The Cathedral of Saint George, also known simply as St. George's Church, is a cathedral of the Melkite Greek Catholic Church in Caracas, Venezuela. It is located in the Montalbán zone at 3rd. Avenue Montalban 2 near the Francisco Fajardo Highway and the Guaire River, in the west of Libertador Municipality.

It is the seat of the Melkite Greek Catholic Apostolic Exarchate of Venezuela, which encompasses all of Venezuela. The Melkite Church is part of the Catholic Church in communion with the Pope in Rome, but observes the Byzantine Rite, and is to be distinguished from the Cathedral of Saint Anne, the cathedral for the Roman Rite church and seat of the Roman Catholic Archdiocese of Caracas.

It is dedicated to Saint George (San Jorge), a Greek-Palestinian saint who by martyred during the Diocletianic Persecution of 303.

See also
Catholic Church in Venezuela

References

Eastern Catholic cathedrals in Venezuela
Churches in Caracas
Melkite Greek Catholic Church in South America
Melkite Greek Catholic cathedrals